Eva Six (born 1937, died 2000s) was a Hungarian born actress who achieved some fame in the early 1960s as a Zsa Zsa Gabor type.

Biography
She was born Éva Klein in Budapest, Hungary, to a Jewish father and Catholic mother. Her father died during the war, and her mother changed the family surname to avoid detection by the Nazis. She won a beauty contest after the war. She and her husband fled Hungary following the 1956 uprising and moved to Hollywood in 1960.

James H. Nicholson of American International Pictures put her under contract and changed her name to "Eva Six". She appeared in a number of films before retiring.

After retiring from acting, she and her husband, architect Roy Schmidt, moved back to Budapest, where she died in the early 2000s; she was reported as having died "a few years ago" by the time of Roy Schmidt's death in 2006, as published on his obituary in Los Angeles Times.

Filmography
Operation Bikini (1963)
Beach Party (1963)
Four for Texas (1963)

References

External links
 

1937 births
2000s deaths
Year of death uncertain
Hungarian film actresses
Jewish Hungarian actors
Hungarian emigrants to the United States
American people of Hungarian-Jewish descent
Actresses from Budapest
Actresses from Los Angeles
21st-century American women